McCafferty is an American indie rock band from Medina, Ohio. The band's lineup currently consists of Nick Hartkop on guitar and vocals and his partner Emily Hartkop on bass.

The band's early releases feature Hartkop performing solo and producing an acoustic dance-punk sound. In later recordings, following the addition of Graham, and subsequently Joecken and Easterly, the band has evolved to encompass a pop-punk and emo sound. The band later reformed in 2018, without Joecken, who went to on to form Sister Sandy with Easterly, while Hartkop's wife Emily Hartkop replaced Joecken on bass. The band has notoriously gone through several breakups and reformations, most recently in February 2020 where all remaining members left the band aside from Nick and Emily.

History
McCafferty was formed in 2011 and at the time was mainly a solo acoustic effort from singer-songwriter Nick Hartkop. Hartkop self-released the EP Moms+Dads under the name McCafferty in June 2012. He followed this up with Japan (his second acoustic EP) and DanceBeats to Hurt Girls on Christmas Day 2012, the first release to feature drummer Evan Graham. In 2013, McCafferty released three EPs – It's a Bad Idea in January, I Hate This Body in April, and Forest Life in July, as well as a collaborative live album, This Will Mean Nothing (A Live Acoustic Split), which featured tracks from Sam Rockwell Machete Champion and Chris Joecken (who at the time had not yet joined McCafferty). Via Soft Speak Records, there was a limited cassette release of I Hate This Body.

In early 2014, the band signed with Monkey Boy Records to release its first full-length LP, Beachboy, on vinyl, and to Sliding Scale Records for a CD release. Following a hard drive crash and the loss of the majority of the songs for the planned When The Lightning Hit EP, the band announced on Facebook they had broken up. However, vocalist Nick would post two demos over the summer to the band's Bandcamp, and in fall of that same year, the Happy Birthday Dad EP was released, containing a mix of old and new songs.

Early 2015 saw the band quietly releasing the track Oh My, and over the summer, the single Top Hat, which was announced as being the lead single to the upcoming Beachboy 2 album.

Between the beginning and summer of 2016 the band started officially working on its second full-length LP, Beachboy 2, but after three singles were released, the project was ultimately abandoned due to Hartkop claiming he had decided to disband the group and return to full-time work as a special education teacher.

In late 2016, the band reformed after a successful fan-led crowdfunding effort to support the production of another EP, with the working title DanceBeats For Hurt Girls. After the overwhelming success of the campaign, the band signed a single record deal with Take This To Heart Records and released Thanks. Sorry. Sure. on June 30, 2017.

On July 22, 2017, Thanks. Sorry. Sure. charted 23rd on Billboards top Independent albums and 5th on Heatseekers Albums and remained there for a week. On February 2, 2018, the band released a split EP alongside fellow Ohio band Heart Attack Man.

On February 13, 2018, the band announced they had signed to Triple Crown Records, and that their second full-length album, Yarn, would be released on March 23, 2018. It was announced on April 1, 2018, that they cancelled their upcoming shows on their tour with Moose Blood, and yet again, the band fell silent on social media.

On June 25, 2018, Hartkop announced via the official McCafferty Twitter that he would be releasing a compilation record titled "The Sum of All Fears" that would include nearly all the tracks from the band's discography pre-Beachboy. While all the material had at one point been on streaming services, it had been nearly four years since this was the case. The record was released on Spotify on June 28, 2018. An EP, Clementine, was released on August 11, along with an official announcement from the band regarding their permanent breakup. The band later reformed, without longtime bassist Chris Joecken.

On December 29, 2018, the band released Yarn: Commentary. It contains input from Wes Easterly, Evan Graham, and Nick Harktop about the influences and ideas behind the album.

The band released their third album, The House with No Doorbell, on October 20, 2019, following a successful small tour. They released a single, "Fentanyl", on June 18 ahead of the release of the album. A second single, "Sellout", was released on September 22. November say McCafferty releasing "Divva (I Murdered Nick Hartkop)", which featured an emo-rap style. The planned tour in support of the album was also cancelled, with Nick's wife taking to Instagram to explain the reasons behind the cancellation. Not long after, an EP was announced featuring re-recorded versions of songs from the band's earlier EPs, with Graveyard (a track from the scrapped When The Lightning Hit EP) being released on December 10. This has yet to be released as of August 2022.

In the weeks following, drummer Wes Easterly announced in a now deleted Instagram post that he was leaving the band, citing difficulties with working alongside Nick. On January 30, 2020, guitarist Evan Graham took to Instagram to detail a number of allegations against Nick, including emotionally abusive behavior, violent threats, and racist jokes. Immediately following this, all social media for McCafferty was deleted, including the personal accounts of both Nick and Emily.

February 2020 saw the compiling of a Google Document featuring the testimony of multiple former partners and people close to Nick, detailing a decade long pattern of physical and emotional abuse of partners, vindictive and hurtful behavior towards band members, and obsessive behavior towards fans.

In July 2020, Easterly, Graham, and Joecken filed a lawsuit against Hartkop over unpaid royalties, totaling over $100,000 in streaming revenue from Spotify alone. Hartkop had allegedly cut the rest of the band off financially when their allegations were published.

On November 6, 2020, Hartkop released a single under the McCafferty name, "Isn't It Beautiful", where he mentioned multiple allegations against him such as: domestic abuse, racism, homophobia, animal abuse, etc. and was "leaving McCafferty behind", and two weeks later two previously unreleased demos, "Two Demos Never Released Back in 2017 So Please Don't Think I'm Coming Back, I Promise You I Won't" were put on streaming services. Despite this, a new song, "Beachboy 2", was released on February 2, 2021, along with another single "If I Saw Him, I'd Still Kiss Him" on March 18, 2021.

Since early 2021, Nick has steadily released singles, and occasionally posts life updates to his blog, detailing his struggles with the various mental illnesses he has been diagnosed with.

On October 27, 2022, McCafferty's fourth album, Snoqualmie Welcomes You was released on YouTube, ahead of its debut on streaming services.

Band members
Members
 Nick Hartkop – rhythm guitar, lead vocals (2011–present)
 Emily Hartkop – bass, backing vocals (2019–present)
 Wyatt Gardner – drums (2020–present)
 Alex D – piano (2020–present)

Former members
 Evan Graham – lead guitar (2014–2020), drums (2012–2014)
 Wes Easterly – drums (2013, 2014–2019)
 Chris Joecken – bass (2014, 2016–2018)
 Noah Yoder - bass (2013, 2014)

Timeline

Discography 
Studio albums
 Beachboy (2014)
 Yarn (2018)
 The House with No Doorbell (2019)
 Snoqualmie Welcomes You (2022)

EPs
 Moms+Dads (2012)
 Japan (2012)
 DanceBeats to Hurt Girls (2012)
 It's A Bad Idea (2013)
 I Hate This Body (2013)
 Forest Life (2013)
 Happy Birthday, Dad (2014)
 Thanks. Sorry. Sure. (2017)
 Forest Life (Remastered) (2017)
 Clementine (2018)
 Two Demos Never Released in 2017 So Please Don't Think I'm Coming Back, I Promise You I Won't (2020)

Compilations
 RIP McCafferty (2015)
 The Sum of All Fears (2018)

Splits
 This Will Mean Nothing (A Live Acoustic Split) (with Sam Rockwell Machete Champion and Chris Joecken) (2013)
 McCafferty / Heart Attack Man Split (Take This To Heart Records, Triple Crown Records, 2018)

Singles
 Skeleton Bones (2013)
 Trees (2013)
 Dead-Bird (2013)
 The Lion's Den (2013)
 When The Lightning Hit (2014)
 Oh My (2015)
 Top Hat (2015)
 Lumber Yard (2016)
 McCafferty Vs. TFB (2016)
 Butterfly (2016)
 The Roots (2016)
 Graveyard (2019)
 Beachboy 2 (2021)
 If I Saw Him, I'd Still Kiss Him (2021)
Queerball (2021)
Witchcraft (2021)
Ugly Duckling (2022)
Cheetah Print Bag (2022)
Salish (2022)
Insincere Everclear (2022)
Liquid Courage (2022)
Snoqualmie (2022)

References

External links 
 
Official Spotify

Musical groups established in 2011
Musical groups from Ohio
Triple Crown Records artists
2011 establishments in Ohio
Take This To Heart Records artists